Tony Powell is an English former football defender who played professionally in England and the United States.

Powell began his career with AFC Bournemouth. In December 1974, Bournemouth sent him to Norwich City in exchange for Trevor Howard. He was voted Norwich City player of the year in 1979. In 1981, he moved to the United States to play for San Jose Earthquakes of the North American Soccer League. He spent two outdoor and two indoor seasons with the Earthquakes. During the second indoor season, the Earthquakes, under the name Golden Bay Earthquakes, competed in the Major Indoor Soccer League. In 1983, he moved to the Seattle Sounders.

External links
Career information at ex-canaries.co.uk

NASL/MISL stats

1947 births
Living people
English footballers
Norwich City F.C. players
AFC Bournemouth players
Golden Bay Earthquakes (MISL) players
Major Indoor Soccer League (1978–1992) players
North American Soccer League (1968–1984) indoor players
North American Soccer League (1968–1984) players
San Jose Earthquakes (1974–1988) players
Seattle Sounders (1974–1983) players
Association football defenders
English expatriate sportspeople in the United States
Expatriate soccer players in the United States
English expatriate footballers